The Audi Type SS was a large, eight-cylinder-powered sedan/saloon car introduced by Audi in 1929 in succession to the Type R "Imperator".

Jørgen Skafte Rasmussen, the Danish-born entrepreneurial industrialist who had purchased Audi-Werke in 1928, had previously, in 1927, purchased the manufacturing plant of the bankrupt Detroit-based Rickenbacker business and shipped it home to Germany. He installed it in a factory he owned just outside Zschopau, near to Audi's own Zwickau plant. The plan was to build large, relatively inexpensive US-style "Rasmussen engines" for sales to other German auto-makers. The plan failed in that Rasmussen failed to secure any orders for the engines, so he instead produced a couple of models of his own which used them. The Audi Type SS (Zwickau) was one of these.

The 5,130 cc straight 8 engine developed a maximum output  at 3,000 rpm, which was relayed using a four-speed transmission through to the rear wheels and converted into a claimed top speed of 110 km/h (68 mph).

The car had two leaf-sprung solid axles and hydraulically controlled brakes which operated on all four wheels. The usual body configurations were available, including a four-door cabriolet and, with a manufacturer's recommended price of 12,950 Marks, a "Pullman-Limousine".

Approximately 400 Audi Zwickaus were produced between 1929 and 1932, which for this size of car was a reasonable tally.

Specifications

Sources
 Oswald, Werner: Deutsche Autos 1920-1945, Motorbuch Verlag Stuttgart, 10. Auflage (1996), 
 

1920s cars
Type SS